Mihanabad (also Romanized as Mīhanābād; also known as Mīhanābād-e Shomālī) is a village in Bostan Rural District, Bostan District, Dasht-e Azadegan County, Khuzestan Province, Iran. At the 2006 census, its population was 78, in 10 families.

References 

Populated places in Dasht-e Azadegan County